Sir Alexander Reid, 2nd Baronet (died 5 March 1750) was a Scottish laird and politician from Aberdeenshire. He sat in the House of Commons of Great Britain from 1710 to 1713.

Reid was the oldest son of Sir John Reid, 1st Baronet, of Barra in Aberdeenshire.  His mother Marion was a daughter of John Abercromby of Glassaugh, Banffshire.  He was educated from 1698 to 1702 at Marischal College of Aberdeen University, and in 1705 he married Agnes Ogily, daughter of Hon. Sir Alexander Ogilvy, 1st Baronet, of Forglen, Banff. They had two sons, one of whom died before his parents.

Reid became a burgess of Kintore by 1710, and he was Kintore's commissioner at the 1710 general election. He used his position to vote for himself as Member of Parliament (MP) for Elgin Burghs in the interest of Lord Seafield.

By the next election, in 1713, Seafield's influence in the Elgin Burghs had waned, and Reid was defeated by James Murray, a Jacobite. He also contested Aberdeenshire, where he was also defeated in an acrimonious contest by Sir Alexander Cumming, Bt. He never stood for Parliament again, despite reports of him planning to put himself forward for various seats.

His father Sir John died some time after 1722, and Alexander then succeeded to the baronetcy.

References 
 

Year of birth missing
17th-century births
1750 deaths
People from Aberdeenshire
Baronets in the Baronetage of Nova Scotia
Members of the Parliament of Great Britain for Scottish constituencies
British MPs 1710–1713
Alumni of the University of Aberdeen